Lipizer is a surname. Notable people with the surname include:

 Rodolfo Lipizer (1895–1974), Italian/Austro-Hungarian violinist
 Alceo Lipizer (1921–1990), Italian footballer